Hans Ingemar Svedberg (6 September 1931 in Piteå, Sweden – 27 July 2012) was a Swedish ice hockey defenceman. For his extraordinary 1957–58 season where he scored eight goals and two assists in 14 games, Svedberg was awarded Guldpucken as ice hockey player of the year.

International play
World Championships gold: 1957
World Championships bronze: 1958
1960 Winter Olympics: fifth place

References

External links

1931 births
2012 deaths
Ice hockey players at the 1960 Winter Olympics
Olympic ice hockey players of Sweden
People from Piteå
Skellefteå AIK players
Swedish ice hockey defencemen
Sportspeople from Norrbotten County